Judith Green (born 1947) is an English medieval historian, who is Emerita Professor of Medieval History at the University of Edinburgh. A graduate of King's College, London and Somerville College, Oxford, she held a research fellowship and then a lectureship at the University of St Andrews before transferring to a lectureship at Queen's University, Belfast. There she became a Reader and, eventually, Professor. In 2005, she took the professorship at Edinburgh, retiring in 2011.

Specialising in Anglo-Norman England, her notable works include:

The Government of England Under Henry I, (Cambridge, 1986)
The Aristocracy of Norman England, (Cambridge, 1997)
Henry I, King of England and Duke of Normandy, (Cambridge, 2006)

The Normans: Power, Conquest and Culture in 11th century Europe (New Haven, 2022)

References
 
 "University of Edinburgh Staff Profile Page: Professor Judith Green"

Further reading
 The Aristocracy of Norman England, Judith A. Green, Cambridge University Press, Cambridge, England, 1997
 « Judith A. Green » at LibraryThing

Academics of the University of Edinburgh
Alumni of King's College London
Associates of King's College London
Alumni of Somerville College, Oxford
British medievalists
Women medievalists
English historians
British women historians
Fellows of the Royal Historical Society
1947 births
Place of birth missing (living people)
Living people